This is a list of Scottish National Party MEPs who were elected as members elected to the European Parliament representing the Scottish National Party.

List of MEPs

See also
 Scottish National Party

References

Scotland, Parliament
SNP
Main
SNP